Sukhur-e Namdar may refer to:
 Sukhur-e Namdar-e Abdi
 Sukhur-e Namdar-e Mirzapur